Jalirpar is a Village and a Union too under Muksudpur Upazila, Gopalganj established in 1634.

The Bil Rout Canal travels through the village of Jalirpar on its way to the Padma River.

Non-governmental organizations operating in Jalirpar include BDAO (the Bangladesh Development Acceleration Organisation), BRAC, CCDB, ASA, World Vision, and HCCB.

References
Jalirpar Map — Satellite Images, coordinates and quick facts about Jalirpar

Populated places in Dhaka Division